A universal library is a library with universal collections. This may be expressed in terms of it containing all existing information, useful information, all books, all works (regardless of format) or even all possible works. This ideal, although unrealizable, has influenced and continues to influence librarians and others and be a goal which is aspired to. Universal libraries are often assumed to have a complete set of useful features (such as finding aids, translation tools, alternative formats, etc.).

History
The Library of Alexandria is generally regarded as the first library approaching universality, although this idea may be more mythical than real.  It is estimated that at one time, this library contained between 30 and 70 percent of all works in existence. The re-founded modern library has a non-universal collections policy.

As a phrase, the "universal library" can be traced back to the naturalist Conrad Gessner's Bibliotheca universalis of 1545.

In the 17th century, the ideal of universality continued to be attractive. The French librarian Gabriel Naudé wrote:
And therefore I shall ever think it extremely necessary, to collect for this purpose all sorts of books, (under such precautions, yet, as I shall establish) seeing a Library which is erected for the public benefit, ought to be universal; but which it can never be, unlesse it comprehend all the principal authors, that have written upon the great diversity of particular subjects, and chiefly upon all the arts and sciences; [...] For certainly there is nothing which renders a Library more recommendable, then when every man findes in it that which he is in search of ...Abstract, C. G. Heyne and the university library at Göttingen: from 'Universalbibliothek' of the eighteenth century to the 'Sammlung Deutscher Drucke', 1701-1800, Graham Jefcoate and Gerd J. Boette, presented at the Second Anglo-German seminar on library history, The universal library: from Alexandria to the internet, London, September 1996.

Fiction
Science fiction has used the device of a library which is universal in the sense that it not only contains all existing written works, but all possible written works.  This idea appeared in Kurd Lasswitz's 1901 story "The Universal Library" and Borges's essay "The Total Library" before its more famous expression in Borges's story "The Library of Babel". Such a library, however, would be as useless as it would be complete. A similar idea was a planet called Memory Alpha, (from the Star Trek episode "The Lights of Zetar") which was the Federation's "storehouse of computer databases containing all cultural history and scientific data it has acquired.". It has been commented that the  Internet already approaches this state.

In Discworld, Terry Pratchett's fantasy world, all libraries in the multiverse are connected in "L-space", effectively creating a single semi-universal library.

Modern times
With the advent of cheap widely available digital storage, the ideal of universality, although still nearly impossible to attain, has become closer to being feasible. Many projects are now attempting to collect  a section of human knowledge into one database. These projects vary in breadth and scope, and none are complete.  Examples include digitization projects such as Project Gutenberg and Carnegie-Mellon's Universal library, digital libraries which are using book scanning to collect public domain works; The European Library, an integrated catalog for Europe's national libraries; the Wikimedia Foundation, which, using the Wiki system, is attempting to collect the breadth of important human knowledge under various open content projects such as Wikipedia and Wiktionary; and some shadow libraries. However, many technical and legal problems remain for the dissemination of all possible knowledge on the Internet.

Current barriers 
Current barriers to the construction of a universal digital library include:
Books have been lost. While the best-known lost library may be the Library at Alexandria, wars, civil strife and natural disasters destroy libraries and archives on a regular basis. Further losses are due to neglect.
Copyright: Many books are under copyright and current widespread business models require scarcity of books to remunerate authors.
Censorship: Most jurisdictions have prohibited at least some banned books.
Unpublished manuscripts: If unpublished manuscripts are included in the definition of book, catching newly written manuscripts is likely to be a challenge.
Current digitization efforts are largely library-based, and so materials deemed outside the scope of libraries are very poorly represented.

See also
Bibliotheca Alexandrina
Encyclopedia Galactica
Google Book Search
Internet Archive
Library of Babel
Library Genesis
Million Book Project
Open Content Alliance
Open Library
Project Gutenberg
World Digital Library

References

Types of library